Chhatarpur District is a district of Madhya Pradesh state of central India. The town of Chhatarpur is the district headquarters.

Geography
Chattarpur district located at 24.06° & 25.20°N 78.59° & 80.26° E respectively. The district has an area of 8,687 km². Chhatarpur District is bounded by Uttar Pradesh state to the north, and the Madhya Pradesh districts of Panna to the east, Damoh to the south, Sagar to the southwest, and Tikamgarh to the west. Chhatarpur District is part of Sagar Division.

Economy
It is one of the 24 districts in Madhya Pradesh currently receiving funds from the Backward Regions Grant Fund Programme (BRGF).

Demographics

According to the 2011 census Chhatarpur District has a population of 1,762,375, roughly equal to the nation of The Gambia or the US state of Nebraska. This gives it a ranking of 271st in India (out of a total of 707). Its population growth rate over the decade 2001-2011 was 19.54%. Chhattarpur has a sex ratio of 884 females for every 1000 males, and a literacy rate of 64.9%. 22.64% of the population lives in urban areas. Scheduled Castes and Tribes made up 23.00% and 4.18% of the population respectively.

At the time of the 2011 Census of India, 74.45%% of the population in the district spoke Bundeli and 24.69% Hindi as their first language.

People from Chhatarpur district 
 Satyavrat Chaturvedi - Former MP for Khajuraho
 Asgari Bai - Dhrupad singer and recipient of Padma Shri
 Babu Gulabrai - Hindi writer
 Virendra Kumar
 Jeetendra Singh Bundela

Villages
 

 Mahoi Kalan

References

External links

 
Districts of Madhya Pradesh
Bundelkhand